Ken Schwartz (born December 3, 1969 in Halifax, Nova Scotia) is a Canadian theatre director, playwright and arts activist.

Biography
Schwartz was born and raised in Halifax, Nova Scotia, graduating from the Halifax Grammar School in 1987, then moving to Montreal to study at the National Theatre School in 1987. He was accepted to the acting, technical theatre and directing sections of the conservatory, graduating from Technical Production in 1990 and from the Directing Section in 1992. After an internship year in Ireland and Northern Ireland, he returned to NS to start Two Planks and a Passion Theatre with his wife, Chris O'Neill. They settled in the Annapolis Valley and have three children.

Early career
Schwartz began acting in High School, from which he took a short leave in his senior year to be on the professional stage at Neptune Theatre in a production of Tartuffe directed by Richard Ouzounian.

After graduation from the National Theatre School, he and his wife spent a year interning with theatre companies in both Northern Ireland and the Republic of Ireland. He watched directors like Paul Mercier, who wrote and directed the Passion Machine's Studs, Charabanc Theatre's Bondagers and was an intern under playwright and director Frank McGuinness for the Druid Company's production of Carthaginians about Bloody Sunday in Derry, which was hailed by critics and which toured to Derry. The choice of Ireland was deliberate because of its similarity to Nova Scotia. It too had a largely rural population with one large city and he chose to work with companies which were creating their own text-based work, often borne of important events in their history and touring it, because of his and his partner's vision for a new theatre in Nova Scotia.

In 1992 they returned to Nova Scotia after a five-year absence and settled in Sheffield Mills, a hamlet close to Wolfville, surrounded by fields and farms. Using the Sheffield Mills community hall for their rehearsal base, Schwartz and O'Neill incorporated Two Planks and a Passion Theatre Association as a non-profit within the province of Nova Scotia.

Two Planks and a Passion Theatre
Two Planks and a Passion Theatre was initially founded and dedicated to touring new Canadian Plays with strong roles for women throughout Nova Scotia and Canada with a focus on rural communities. Schwartz and O'Neill were particularly interested in using Nova Scotian history and events to create new drama, "a theatre rooted in emotional realism and community experience". The first production was a Nova Scotian premiere of Daniel MacIvor's See Bob Run, a one-woman show starring O'Neill and directed by Schwartz. It began at the Atlantic Fringe Festival then toured to Wolfville. The company continued to develop its touring activity with other Nova Scotian premieres such as Linda Griffiths The Darling Family which was their first tour outside of NS, to Charlottetown PEI. Schwartz and O'Neill continued to work toward developing new productions and in 1993 created The Butterbox Babies, based on the best-selling book by Bette Cahill.

When Schwartz and O'Neill resettled in Nova Scotia, there was major news of a coal mining disaster at the Westray Mine in Pictou County, NS. People from across the province and the country were caught up in the struggle to rescue and then recover the miners and the subsequent political scandal. Schwartz and O'Neill soon purchased the rights to journalist Dean Jobb's book which gave them access to hours of tapes of interviews with mine managers, miners, draegermen and mine families. The resulting production was the company's most extensive tour, in part supported by the United Steelworkers of America. The show opened in the mining community, next door to the courthouse where mine managers were concurrently on trial for their role in the disaster. From there it went on to play performing arts centres, schools and mining communities.

Schwartz continued to direct all the productions for Two Planks and a Passion Theatre with the exception of their first production of Mike Melski's Hockey Mom, Hockey Dad, and Pegalie in 2006, for which he was producer only. He and O'Neill wrote two more shows for the company before he switched focus and took the company from a purely touring production company to one based solidly at the Ross Creek Centre for the Arts. In 2007 he directed Rick Chafe's The Odyssey, a Canadian adaptation of the classic story  by Homer. In Schwartz's interpretation, the show was presented by shipwrecked crew from Nova Scotia's past and the show garnered many award nominations along with critical and audience success. this became the first of the Theatre off the Grid series which has become the cornerstone of the Schwartz' work.

In 2008 he directed two productions at Ross Creek: Our Town by Thortnon Wilder and Jerome: The Historical Spectacle, which he commissioned from Ami McKay, author of The Birth House.

In 2008 he was nominated for Best Director at the NS professional theatre Awards  (The Merritt Awards) and in 2009 he won that award for his direction of Our Town while also winning Outstanding Production for that show. In 2009 he was also awarded the Established award by the NS Government and in 2002, Schwartz received the Queen's Golden Jubilee Medal for his service to the community. In 2010 Schwartz's production of Rockbound, a musical written by Allen Cole and based on the novel by Frank Parker Day was nominated for 7 professional theatre Awards, and took home 5 Merritt Awards, including Best New Play, Best Musical Score, Best Director for Ken Schwartz, and Best Production.

In 2010, Schwartz directed an Off the Grid outdoor production of Arthur Miller's The Crucible.
In 2011, his Off the Grid Production was the world premiere of Winnipeg Playwright Rick Chafe's Beowulf, which Schwartz had commissioned for the theatre.
In 2012, he adapted Aristophenes' classic Lysistrata, creating an American Civil War setting for the tale of women stopping a war through a sex strike. He collaborated with Allen Cole, who wrote the Music and Lyrics in the adaptation.
In 2013 he directed As You Like It by William Shakespeare and his own adaptation of Homer's Iliad told around a campfire.

Other Work
In 2010 Schwartz was accepted to the Michael Langham Workshop for Classical Text at the Stratford Shakespeare Festival in Ontario and took a sabbatical from Two Planks to complete this program, which included assistant directing J.M. Barrie's Peter Pan under British director Tim Carroll. In 2013 he returned to Stratford for a second workshop, this time assisting Tim Carroll on Romeo and Juliet.

In 2013 he directed Six Characters in Search of an Author by Luigi Pirandello for the Dalhousie Theatre Department, and narrated the readings for the Kings College Chapel Choir Annual Christmas tour, under Paul Halley's direction.

Writing
Schwartz has been a writer throughout his career, both of plays and articles. His most recent work was an adaptation in Iambic pentameter of Homer's Iliad, and in 2012, he adapted the Greek classic comedy Lysistrata as a musical (lyrics and music by Allen Cole) set in the American South during the Civil War.

His play (co-written with Chris O'Neill) of Westray: the Long Way Home, was published in 1995 and then republished by Talonbooks in the early 21st century.

He and O'Neill contributed an article to the Canadian Theatre Review about their unique partnership with the United Steelworkers of America to produce the Westray show and tour it throughout Canada. His writing on touring theatre in Canada "The Long and Winding Road: Touring Canada with Two Planks and a Passion Theatre", was included in the Canadian Theatre Review's summer 2005 issue on working conditions in Canadian Theatre and his writing on the demolition of the NS Arts Council, "A Principle in Exile: The Elimination of the Nova Scotia Arts Council", was included in Fuse Magazine in August 2002. He also acts as dramaturg for the new works in development at Two Planks and a Passion Theatre.

Advocacy
Schwartz was involved in arts advocacy both on a personal and organizational level from the beginning of his Nova Scotian career. He was on the founding board of the Nova Scotia Professional Theatre Alliance (now Theatre Nova Scotia) and has continued to support that organization as a board, panel and jury member since 1995.

In the late 1990s, Schwartz was nominated to the newly formed arms length Nova Scotian Arts Council, a group legislated by the province to distribute funds to artists through peer juries. He served on the founding board of the Council for three years.

In 2002, the Province of Nova Scotia, under Minister of Tourism and Culture Rodney MacDonald closed the Arts Council unilaterally, locking the doors and firing almost all staff. The arts community reacted strongly and Schwartz was elected chair of the resulting "Save our Arts Council campaign" which included his debating the minister on television. The Council was not reinstated.

Schwartz has continued to be active in arts advocacy, participating in a national arts lobbying effort to members of the Canadian Parliament and serving on the provincial government's Arts and Culture Partnership Council. He has served on the board of the Professional Association of Canadian Theatres among other organizations.

Arts Community
Part of Schwartz and O'Neill's vision when they began the touring theatre company was to have a separate but connected organization which would bring national and international artists to their rural Nova Scotian Community and create a centre for arts education, creation and development - a rural laboratory for all the arts. In 2000 the association purchased a  farm on the Annapolis Valley's North Mountain and added the Ross Creek Centre for the Arts to their bailiwick. While he serves as CEO of CoastArts, the larger umbrella organization that was created to govern both the Ross Creek Centre and Two Planks and a Passion Theatre, his daily responsibilities currently focus primarily on the Theatre Company.

Awards and recognition
 2002 - Queen's Golden Jubilee Medal.
 2008 - Robert Meritt Nominee for Outstanding Direction for the 2007 production of The Odyssey by Rick Chafe produced by Two Planks and Passion Theatre Company
 2008 - Robert Meritt Award for Outstanding Production for the 2007 production of The Odyssey by Rick Chafe produced by Two Planks and Passion Theatre Company
 2009 - NS Government Established Artist Recognition Award
 2009 - Robert Meritt Award for Outstanding Production for the 2008 production of Our Town by Thornton Wilder produced by Two Planks and Passion Theatre Company
 2009 - Robert Meritt Award for Outstanding Direction for the 2008 production of Our Town by Thornton Wilder produced by Two Planks and Passion Theatre Company
 2010 - Robert Meritt Award for Outstanding Production for the 2009 production of Rockbound by Allen Cole produced by Two Planks and Passion Theatre Company
 2010 - Robert Meritt Award for Outstanding Direction for the 2009 production of Rockbound by Allen Cole produced by Two Planks and Passion Theatre Company
 2011 - His production of The Crucible nominated for 4 Robert Merritt Awards, winning best actor and best supporting actor Merrit Awards
 2012 - His production of Beowulf nominated for 2 Robert Merritt Awards
 2012 - Queen's Diamond Jubilee Medal

Further reading
Dean Jobb, Calculated Risk: Greed, Politics and the Westray Tragedy (Nimbus Publishing, 1994)
Chris O’Neill, Ken Schwartz, Westray: The Long Way Home (Talonbooks)

References

External links
 National Theatre School
 Theatre Nova Scotia
 Two Planks and a Passion Theatre
 Ross Creek Centre for the Arts
 From Artillery to Zuppa Circus, Recorded Memory of Theatre Life in NS

1969 births
Living people
Canadian theatre directors
People from Halifax, Nova Scotia